Nathan Pellissier (born on 17 March 1996) is an Australian Paralympic table tennis player. He represented Australia at the 2020 Tokyo Paralympics where he won a silver medal.

Personal 
Pellissier was born on 17 March 1996 with cerebral palsy. In a four-year period late last decade, he had two hip surgeries and bone grafts. He attended the Maribyrnong Sports Academy. He completed his Bachelor of Business degree at RMIT and is working part-time at Coolahbah Law Chambers. In 2020, he has commenced Master of Professional Accounting and Finance at Deakin University. He lives in Williamstown, Victoria. In 2021, Pellissier was named as Deakin University's Sportsperson of the Year – Disability.

Table tennis 
Pellister is classified as C8 table tennis player. He competed at the 2014 World Para Table Tennis Championships in China. In 2017, he finally defeated his C8 rival Barak Mizrachi at the Australian Para Table Tennis Nationals.

In 2017, he won gold medals at three major international championships, including the Korean Para Open and the Taiwan Para Open. The following year he lived and trained in Munich, Germany, picking up bronze medals at the Spanish Para Open and US Para Open, before gaining valuable experience at the World Championships in Slovenia.

At the 2019 Oceania Para Table Tennis Championships, Darwin, he won the silver medal in the Men’s Singles Class 6-10 and gold medal with Joel Coughlan in the Class 6-10 Teams.

At the 2020 Tokyo Paralympics, he lost both matches in the Men's Individual C8 and won a silver medal with Ma Lin and Joel Coughlan in the Men's Team C9-10.

References

External links 
 
 Personal website

1996 births
Living people
Paralympic table tennis players of Australia
Table tennis players at the 2020 Summer Paralympics
Medalists at the 2020 Summer Paralympics
Paralympic medalists in table tennis
Paralympic silver medalists for Australia
People from Williamstown, Victoria
Cerebral Palsy category Paralympic competitors
Sportspeople from Melbourne
Deakin University alumni
RMIT University alumni
Sportsmen from Victoria (Australia)